Korbel may refer to:

Companies
Korbel Champagne Cellars

Places
 Korbel, Humboldt County, California
 Korbel, Sonoma County, California

People
Daniel Korbel, Canadian bridge player.
Jan O. Korbel (born 1975), German biologist
Josef Korbel (1909–1977), Czech-American diplomat and educator
Charly Körbel (born 1954), German footballer
Mario Korbel (1882–1954), Czech-American sculptor
Petr Korbel (born 1971), Czech table tennis player

See also
 Killing of Olivia Pratt-Korbel
 Josef Korbel School of International Studies, a graduate school for international affairs at the University of Denver
 Nolwenn Korbell (born 1968), French singer-songwriter
 Corbel (disambiguation)
 Corbell (disambiguation)
 Corbeau (disambiguation)